Evgeny Nikolaevich Alekseev (22 March 1919 – 28 February 2005) was a Soviet and Russian professional basketball player and coach.

Club playing career
Alekseev played club basketball with the Soviet clubs Lokomotiv Moscow, CSKA Moscow, where he was the team's captain, and VVS Moscow. He won three USSR League championships, in the years 1939, 1945, and 1952.

National team playing career
Alekseev was the captain of the senior Soviet Union national basketball team. He played with the USSR at the EuroBasket 1947, where he won a gold medal, and averaged 10.2 points per game. He was subsequently named an Honored Master of Sports of the USSR.

Coaching career
After his basketball playing career ended, Alekseev began working as a basketball coach, in 1953. As the head coach of CSKA Moscow, he won 6 USSR League championships, and two FIBA European Champions Cups (now called EuroLeague) titles, in 1961 and 1963, while also leading CSKA to the EuroLeague Finals in 1965. He was also the head coach of Dynamo Moscow. 

As the head coach of Spartak Moscow Women, he won the USSR Women's League championship in 1978, and the Ronchetti Women's Cup three times (1977, 1981, and 1982).

He also worked as an assistant coach of the senior Soviet Union national basketball team. He was an assistant coach on the Soviet Union team that won a silver medal at the 1960 Summer Olympics. He was subsequently named a Merited Coach of the USSR. He was also an assistant coach with the Soviet Union, when they won the gold medal at the EuroBasket 1961.

Awards and honors
Honored Master of Sports of the USSR
Merited Coach of the USSR
Order of Friendship of Peoples
Order of the Badge of Honour
Order of the Patriotic War
Order of the Red Star

Personal life
Alekseev's wife, Lidiya Alekseyeva, was a well-known basketball player, and also the long-time head basketball coach of the senior USSR women's national basketball team.

See also
 List of EuroLeague-winning head coaches

References

External links
 FIBA Player Profile
 Evgeny Alekseev at biograph.ru 

1919 births
2005 deaths
Basketball players from Moscow
People from Moskovsky Uyezd
Russian basketball coaches
Russian men's basketball players
Soviet basketball coaches
Soviet men's basketball players
BC Dynamo Moscow coaches
EuroLeague-winning coaches
PBC CSKA Moscow coaches
PBC CSKA Moscow players
Russian State University of Physical Education, Sport, Youth and Tourism alumni
Soviet military personnel of World War II
Honoured Masters of Sport of the USSR
Merited Coaches of the Soviet Union
Recipients of the Order of the Red Star
Recipients of the Order of Friendship of Peoples